Mohammed Djetei Camara (born 18 August 1994) is a Cameroonian footballer who plays for Spanish club Albacete Balompié and the Cameroon national team as a central defender.

Club career
Born in Yaoundé, Djetei made his senior debut with International Sporting Club of Douala in 2012. In 2014, he moved to Union Douala, after a partnership between both clubs was established.

On 4 July 2016, Djetei signed a four-year deal with Spanish Segunda División side Gimnàstic de Tarragona. He made his debut for the club on 12 October, starting in a 1–1 Copa del Rey away draw against Rayo Vallecano (5–4 win on penalties).

Djetei made his debut in the second level on 6 November 2016, playing the full 90 minutes in a 1–0 away win against CD Mirandés. In August of the following year, during a pre-season match against Real Zaragoza, he suffered a serious knee injury.

On 2 September 2019, Djetei signed a contract with Segunda División B side Córdoba CF.

International career
On 18 October 2015, Djetei made his international debut with a local team of Cameroon, after starting in a 0–0 2016 African Nations Championship qualification home draw against Congo. He also made the 23-man list for the final tournament, all teams being consisted exclusively of players playing in their African homecountries.

On 30 May 2016, Djetei made his full international debut, appearing in a 2–3 friendly away loss against France after coming on as a late substitute for Aurélien Chedjou at the Stade de la Beaujoire in Nantes. The following 5 January, he was included in Hugo Broos' 23-man squad ahead of the 2017 Africa Cup of Nations, being used as a backup as his side was crowned champions.

Honours

International
Cameroon
Africa Cup of Nations: 2017

References

External links
Evol'in Sport profile 

1994 births
Living people
Footballers from Yaoundé
Cameroonian footballers
Association football defenders
Union Douala players
Segunda División players
Primera Federación players
Segunda División B players
Gimnàstic de Tarragona footballers
Córdoba CF players
Albacete Balompié players
2017 Africa Cup of Nations players
Cameroon under-20 international footballers
Cameroon international footballers
Cameroonian expatriate footballers
Cameroonian Muslims
Cameroonian expatriate sportspeople in Spain
Expatriate footballers in Spain
Cameroon A' international footballers
2016 African Nations Championship players